Maximilian Romedio Johann-Ernst Graf von Thun und Hohenstein (born 21 February 1977 in Munich, Germany), commonly known as Max von Thun, is an Austrian actor and television presenter. He is the son of actor, Count Friedrich von Thun und Hohenstein and his wife, Gabriele Bleyler (1941). By birth he is a member of an ancient House of Thun und Hohenstein.

Selected filmography

References

External links
 

1977 births
Living people
Austrian male film actors
Austrian male television actors
Austrian nobility
Max
Actors from Munich